Upper Township may refer to the following townships in the United States:

 Upper Township, New Jersey in Cape May County
 Upper Township, Lawrence County, Ohio